A Decade of Hits 1969–1979 is a compilation album of the Allman Brothers Band, released in 1991. The album features songs released on The Allman Brothers Band, Idlewild South, At Fillmore East, Eat a Peach, Brothers and Sisters, and Enlightened Rogues. It is the band's best-selling album in the U.S., being certified double platinum by the RIAA in 1997.

Track listing

"Statesboro Blues" (Live) (Blind Willie McTell) – 4:20
"Ramblin' Man" (Dickey Betts) – 4:49
"Midnight Rider" (Gregg Allman, Robert Payne) – 2:59
"Southbound" (Dickey Betts) – 5:10
"Melissa" (Gregg Allman, Steve Alaimo) – 3:56
"Jessica" (Dickey Betts) – 7:30
"Ain't Wastin' Time No More" (Gregg Allman)  – 3:40
"Little Martha" (Duane Allman) – 2:10
"Crazy Love" (Dickey Betts) – 3:44
"Revival" (Dickey Betts) – 4:03
"Wasted Words" (Gregg Allman) – 4:20
"Blue Sky" (Dickey Betts) – 5:10
"One Way Out" (Live) (Elmore James, Marshall Sehorn, Sonny Boy Williamson II) – 4:58
"In Memory of Elizabeth Reed" (Dickey Betts) – 6:57
"Dreams" (Gregg Allman) – 7:19
"Whipping Post" (Gregg Allman) – 5:17

Track 1 from At Fillmore East (1971), recorded live 3/1971 at the Fillmore East in New York, NY
Tracks 2, 4, 6 and 11 from Brothers and Sisters (1973)
Tracks 3, 10, 14 from Idlewild South (1970)
Tracks 5, 7–8, 12–13 from Eat a Peach (1972), track 13 recorded live 6/27/1971 at the Fillmore East in New York, NY
Track 9 from Enlightened Rogues (1979)
Track 15–16 from The Allman Brothers Band (1969)

Notes

The Allman Brothers Band compilation albums
1991 greatest hits albums
Albums produced by Tom Dowd
Polydor Records compilation albums